Quinshon Judkins (born October 29, 2003) is an American football running back for the Ole Miss Rebels.

Early life and high school
Judkins grew up in Pike Road, Alabama and attended Pike Road High School. He was named first team Class 5A All-State as a junior after rushing for 1,482 yards and 25 touchdowns on 150 carries. Judkins rushed for 1,534 yards and 26 touchdowns as a senior. He was rated a three-star recruit and committed to play college football at Ole Miss over offers from Auburn and Notre Dame.

College career
Judkins entered his freshman as the second-string running back for the Ole Miss Rebels. He was named the Southeastern Conference (SEC) co-Freshman of the Week for Week 4 after rushing for 140 yards and two touchdowns on 27 carries in a 35-27 win over Tulsa.

References

External links
Ole Miss Rebels bio

2003 births
Living people
American football running backs
Ole Miss Rebels football players
Players of American football from Alabama